= Luca Perregrini =

Italian engineer

Luca Perregrini from the University of Pavia, Italy was named Fellow of the Institute of Electrical and Electronics Engineers (IEEE) in 2016 for contributions to numerical techniques for electromagnetic modeling.
